Teret or Terets may be a reference to:

Things
 Tourette syndrome, a neurological disorder
 Teres major muscle, an upper back muscle attaching the upper limb
 Teres minor muscle, an upper back muscle attaching the rotator cuff
 Terete, adjective meaning cylindrical with a tapering end or ends
 Terets (gunboat), an Imperial Russian gunboat 
 Terret, part of a horse harness

People
 Christopher Teret, member of Company, a band
 Ray Teret, British radio DJ
 Stephen Teret, Johns Hopkins professor
 Walker David Teret, member of Television Hill, a folk rock band

Arts, entertainment, and media

Films
 The Load (Teret, Терет), a Serbian war drama film directed by Ognjen Glavonić